The Diocese of Caldas is a Latin Church ecclesiastical territory or diocese in Colombia. The episcopal see is the city of Caldas. The Diocese of Caldas is a suffragan diocese in the ecclesiastical province of the metropolitan Archdiocese of Medellín. The Bishop of the Diocese of Caldas is Juan Fernando Franco Sánchez.

History
 18 June 1988: Established as Diocese of Caldas from the Metropolitan Archdiocese of Medellín

Bishops

Ordinaries
Germán Garcia Isaza, C.M. (1988.06.18 – 2002.03.01) Appointed, Bishop of Apartadó
José Soleibe Arbeláez (2002.12.06 – 2015.01.28)
César Alcides Balbín Tamayo (2015.01.28 – 2021.10.19) Appointed, Bishop of Cartago
Juan Fernando Franco Sánchez (2021.12.16 – ...)

Other priest of this diocese who became bishop
Fidel León Cadavid Marin, appointed Bishop of Quibdó in 2001

See also
Roman Catholicism in Colombia

References

External links
 Catholic Hierarchy
 GCatholic.org

Roman Catholic dioceses in Colombia
Roman Catholic Ecclesiastical Province of Medellín
Christian organizations established in 1988
Roman Catholic dioceses and prelatures established in the 20th century